Antonio "Tony" Montana is a fictional character and the protagonist of the 1983 film Scarface. This character is portrayed by Al Pacino in the film and is voiced by André Sogliuzzo in the 2006 video game Scarface: The World Is Yours. Embodying the rise from the bottom to the top, Tony Montana has become a cultural icon and is one of the most well-known movie characters of all time. 

In 2008, Montana was named the 27th Greatest Movie Character by Empire magazine. The character is partly based on Tony Camonte, the protagonist of the original novel and the 1932 film adaptation; Camonte was, in turn, an adaptation of Tony Guarino from the 1929 novel, who in turn was a loose fictionalization of real-life Italian-American gangster Al Capone, born in Brooklyn, New York in 1899. In contrast to Guarino and Camonte, who were both Italian immigrants, Montana is a Cuban immigrant. According to Oliver Stone, Tony's last name was inspired by former NFL quarterback Joe Montana, Stone's favorite player. A prequel novel, Scarface: The Beginning, written by L. A. Banks, was published in 2006. Montana has a large scar on the side of his face, which explains why he is known as Scarface. This is the same type of scar that Al Capone received from a bar fight in 1917 at the Harvard Inn.

Casting
Pacino insisted on taking the lead role in Scarface, although Robert De Niro had been offered this role and had turned it down. Pacino worked with various trainers for the role, including experts in knife combat and boxer Roberto Durán. Durán also helped inspire the character, who had "a certain lion in him", according to Pacino. Meryl Streep's immigrant character in Sophie's Choice (1982) also influenced Pacino's portrayal of Tony Montana. His co-star Steven Bauer and a dialect coach helped him learn aspects of the Cuban dialect and pronunciation.

Fictional character biography

Prior to the events of the film, Tony grew up in a poor Havana neighborhood of Spanish immigrants, his grandparents having been Isleños. He obtained his signature scar fighting a Cuban army officer, whom he killed with a shotgun when he was 13 years old. After being arrested as a young man, Tony joined the Cuban army and served in Angola where he went AWOL and boarded a cargo ship to France. There he was arrested for shoplifting and was deported back to Cuba in the late 1970s where he was placed in prison.

In May 1980, Tony winds up as one of the 125,000 Cubans on the Mariel boatlift to Miami. When he arrives, he is questioned by U.S. officials and says, he is a "political prisoner." Tony claims that because he had an American father, he has the right to a green card. However, because of a trident-style tattoo on his right hand, which indicates that he was an assassin in prison, his request is denied.

Tony and his friend Manolo "Manny" Ribera are sent to "Freedomtown," a refugee camp that holds Cuban immigrants without green cards. After one month in the camp, Frank Lopez, head of a Miami drug cartel, offers to obtain green cards in return for murdering Emilio Rebenga, a one-time nomenklatura who had tortured people to death (Lopez's brother among them), only to later have Castro turn on him. Soon after Rebenga arrives at the camp, a riot breaks out in Freedomtown on August 11, 1980. Manny and Angel Fernandez take advantage of the bedlam to stalk Rebenga, who leaves the tent where Tony is waiting outside, and stabs Rebenga in the stomach. Tony and Manny are reconsidered and granted green cards, later being released. The two get jobs as dishwashers for a small food stand in Little Havana. Some time later, Frank sends his right-hand man, Omar Suarez, to offer them a job that pays $500 each to Tony and Manny for a few hours of work unloading smuggled marijuana from a boat. While Manny is impressed with the offer, Tony is angered about being offered less than the minimal pay for such a job, and he and Omar quarrel. On the advice of his compatriot, Omar then offers Tony and Manny $5,000 to buy cocaine from a new supplier, which is riskier than the marijuana deal as it is dealing with violent Colombians.

A few days later, Tony, Manny, and their associates, Angel and Chi Chi, drive to a hotel in Miami Beach to make the deal with a group of Colombians. The deal goes badly. A couple of Colombian enforcers handcuff Tony and Angel to a shower pole at gunpoint, threatening to kill them with a chainsaw if Tony doesn't reveal the location of the drug money. Tony refuses to talk, and Hector, the enforcers' leader, dismembers Angel. Before Hector can do the same to Tony, Manny bursts into the room shooting a machine pistol. A short gunfight ensues, in which Manny is shot in the arm and Tony kills the Colombians. Tony, Manny, and Chi Chi escape with the cocaine and the money. Tony, who no longer trusts Omar, takes it to Frank personally. Frank is impressed, and he and Manny wind up working for him, during which time Tony takes an interest in Frank's girlfriend, Elvira Hancock.

Three months later, Tony pays a visit to his mother, Georgina, and younger sister, Gina, neither of whom have seen him for five years. Gina is excited to see Tony, but his mother is ashamed of him, having long ago learned of his life of crime. When he gives his mother $1,000, she angrily rejects the gift and throws him out. Tony leaves, but Gina runs after him and hugs him, telling Tony she has been going to hairdressing school and helping out Mama. Tony says that a poor girl like Gina deserves to have a little fun. He secretly slips her the $1,000 and orders her not to tell Mama about it, only that Mama gets a little bit of it from time to time, through using some of it for grocery shopping or paying a utility bill. Manny, who had been waiting or Tony in the car, is taken with Gina, only for Tony to bark at Manny to stay away from his sister.

Later, while in Bolivia, Tony and Omar go on Frank's behalf to see drug cartel lord Alejandro Sosa. Sosa has Omar killed for being a police informant and makes Tony his business partner. At The Babylon nightclub, Tony is shaken down by corrupt narcotics detective Mel Bernstein, who informs him that he has evidence linking Tony to the murders of Rebenga and the Colombian drug dealers. Bernstein proposes to "tax" Tony on his transactions in return for police protection and information. Tony is convinced that Frank sent Bernstein, because only Frank would know details about the murders. While talking to Bernstein, Tony sees Gina dancing with a low-level drug dealer. Enraged, Tony beats the dealer and slaps Gina, stopping only after Manny calms him down. Manny drives Gina home and tells her she can do better than those lowlifes and that Tony is only looking out for her. However, when Gina admits an interest in Manny, he freezes, having remembered Tony's tirade.

Later that night, two men attempt to kill Tony. He escapes and becomes convinced that Frank ordered his death. Armed with silenced pistols, Tony and Manny track Frank down to his car dealership, killing him and Bernstein. Afterward, Tony goes to Frank's house, telling Elvira that her lover is dead and that he wants her. Over the next year and a half, Tony makes $75 million from 2,000 kilograms of cocaine that he brings to America, and is soon making $10–15 million every month in profits from his business relationship with Sosa. He marries Elvira and takes over Frank's empire, purchasing a large mansion as well as ornate luxuries, such as a pet tiger. Tony also creates many legal businesses as fronts, including a hair salon managed by Gina. Cracks in Tony's "American dream" begin to form, however, as both he and Elvira become addicted to cocaine, as well as his empire, in that his banker demands more money, warning it is getting increasingly tougher to hide drug money. Meanwhile, Manny and Gina begin dating behind her brother's back, afraid of Tony's wrath should he find out.

When Tony finds a new banker, he turns out to be an undercover policeman who arrests Tony for money laundering and tax evasion. Tony's lawyer, George Sheffield, tells Tony that although he can plea bargain away most of the time he's facing, he'll still end up serving at least three years in prison. Sosa calls Tony down to Bolivia and asks him for help assassinating a Bolivian anti-government activist, who is exposing Sosa's dealings with Bolivian leaders. In exchange, Sosa will use his contacts in the U.S. Justice Department in Washington, D.C., to keep Tony out of prison. After returning to Miami, Tony does not tell Manny about the hit, although Manny tries to talk Tony out of going to New York City, simply citing a bad premonition he has about it. When Tony makes a scene at a fancy restaurant by insulting Elvira's inability to bear children, let alone do anything else with her life, she lashes out and leaves him. 

Tony and Sosa's associate Alberto travel to New York to assassinate the activist. Alberto plants a bomb under the activist's car and is ordered to detonate it before the activist can implicate Sosa's criminal network in a speech at the United Nations Building. On the day of the assassination, a woman and two children are unexpectedly seen getting into the target's car. Tony objects to carrying out the hit, preferring to only kill the intended target. Alberto reminds Tony of Sosa's demands and Tony reluctantly begins to tail the target. Tony's disgust at the idea of killing an innocent woman with her two kids grows, however, while Alberto concentrates on activating the explosive. Before Alberto is able to detonate the car bomb, Tony shoots and kills Alberto out of anger, thus double-crossing Sosa.

Tony returns to Florida and receives a telephone call from a furious Sosa, who chastises him for the failed hit, saying that the bomb was found and the whistleblower is under heavy security, making it impossible for them to conspire another hit. Tony's mother then says she cannot find Gina, accusing him of corrupting her. Tony attempts to locate Gina, and finds her with Manny. When he sees they are wearing bathrobes, Tony perceives the two having sexual intercourse. An enraged Tony shoots and kills Manny in a cocaine-fueled rage before Gina reveals that they had just married and were going to announce their matrimony to Tony by the time he returned home. Tony and his henchmen take a distraught Gina back to his mansion. Meanwhile, a large group of assassins sent by Sosa surrounds the mansion. While a distraught Tony sits in his office, snorting vast quantities of cocaine, the gunmen begin killing his guards outside, while Tony is oblivious to his closed circuit cameras (ironically boasting to Manny in an earlier scene he spent top dollar on the cameras to prevent such an incident). Gina enters Tony's office wielding a Smith & Wesson Model 36, accusing him of his selfishness towards her, before shooting him in the leg. This startles one assassin who was laying in the wait. He approaches the room out of nowhere and opens fire on Gina, killing her. Tony then shoots the assassin dead.

Deprived of the element of surprise, Sosa's gunmen attack Tony's mansion directly. Tony bursts from his office wielding an M16 rifle with a M203 grenade launcher attachment. He yells, "Say hello to my little friend!" and opens fire on the henchmen, killing many of them, despite being heavily wounded by return fire. The carnage continues until Sosa's top assassin ("The Skull") sneaks up behind him and fatally shoots Tony in the back with a shotgun. Tony falls from his balcony into a fountain in the lobby below, floating dead in his bloodied pool, beneath a statue of the globe carrying the inscription enlightened in pink neon, "The World Is Yours."

Comic book
A one-time comic book in 2003 was made for the film's 20th anniversary as a pseudosequel. It picks up directly at the end of the film, where authorities are assessing the damage done to the Montana mansion, only to discover Tony still alive in the fountain, his body being so drugged that it failed to stop working. After months spent in the hospital, Tony is greeted by corrupt cops, who say the federal government seized everything. The book also has Sosa continuing his revenge against Tony and provides some of Sosa's backstory, in which he employed poor villagers in making drugs in exchange for their financial support, a la Pablo Escobar.

Video games 
The 2006 video game Scarface: The World Is Yours is a pseudo-sequel to the film, which features an alternate ending wherein Tony kills the Skull and manages to escape from his mansion before it is overrun by Sosa's men and the police, though he loses all his money and drugs. Presumed dead, he goes into hiding in a small shack near Virginia Key Beach, where he laments the deaths of Manny and Gina, curses himself for not listening to the advice of others due to his stubbornness, determines to quit cocaine, and plots his revenge against Sosa. Three months later, Tony comes out of hiding to rebuild his criminal empire and makes $10,000 in a single day of selling drugs, which he uses to bribe several undercover police officers, who have seized his mansion, allowing him to move back. He goes on to expand his empire and eliminate multiple rivals who are eager to take over. He still faces opposition from Sosa and Gaspar Gomez, who have teamed up to form a drug monopoly and set their prices unreasonably high. Tony is also betrayed by his lawyer, George Sheffield, who is in a secret alliance with Sosa and Gomez and leads him into a trap, from which he barely escapes. Eventually, Tony is able to eliminate all his competition in Miami and re-establish his empire, before traveling to the Caribbean to help a cocaine producer called "The Sandman", who in turn sells him his plantation. During this time, Tony also meets The Sandman's ex-girlfriend Venus, with whom he enters into a relationship. Now the most powerful drug lord in Miami, Tony sets out to exact his revenge on Sosa, Gomez, and Sheffield, and attacks the former's mansion, where he kills all three of them. On his way out, he stumbles upon one of Sosa's surviving goons, whom he spares and hires as his butler. The game ends with Tony married to Venus and living in luxury, feeling that he finally got what was coming to him: the world.

Tony also appears in the 2006 video game Scarface: Money. Power. Respect.

Tony appears in the video game Payday 2 as a playable character named "Scarface", included in the Scarface Character Pack released in 2016. He is voiced by André Sogliuzzo, who previously voiced him in Scarface: The World Is Yours. The DLC also included a heist that takes place at Tony's mansion in Miami.

References

External links
Rotten Tomatoes Scarface Movie Quotes

Crime film characters
Fictional Angolan Civil War veterans
Fictional characters from Miami
Film characters introduced in 1983
Fictional characters with disfigurements
Fictional contract killers
Fictional crime bosses
Fictional criminals in films
Fictional cocaine users
Fictional Cuban-American people
Fictional drug dealers
Fictional gangsters
Fictional gunfighters in films
Fictional murdered people
Fictional Hispanic and Latino American people
Fictional immigrants to the United States
Fictional mass murderers
Fictional military personnel in films
Fictional money launderers
Fictional soldiers
Scarface (1983 film)
Fictional Hispanic and Latino American people in video games